The 125th Pennsylvania Infantry volunteered during the American Civil War and served a 9-month term from August 1862 to May 1863. It selected the motto In God We Trust. The Regiment fought at the Battle of Antietam under the leadership of Colonel Jacob C. Higgins less than six weeks after being recruited in Blair, Cambria and Huntingdon Counties. The Regiment was noted for its charge through the East Woods, along the Great Cornfield, down Smoketown Road, past the Dunker Church, and into the West Woods. While in formation beyond the Dunker Church in an 'overextended' position, the Regiment repulsed four counterattacks at a price of 229 casualties (33% of engaged) within 20 minutes. A fifth, heavily reinforced Confederate counterattack forced a retreat with a desperate struggle to retain the Regimental colors. Two weeks before the end of their enlistment, the 125th Pennsylvania also occupied the perimeter of Chancellorsville, Virginia, during the Battle of Chancellorsville.

Composition 

As the Civil War extended into its second year, President Abraham Lincoln appealed nationally for 300,000 additional men on July 1, 1862. In response on July 21, Governor A. G. Curtin called for 21 new regiments from the Commonwealth of Pennsylvania with nine-month enlistments. Four regiments were expected from Blair and Huntingdon Counties, and the 125th Regiment of Pennsylvania Volunteers was recruited as ten companies from late July through early August.

The great majority had no previous military experience and came from all walks of life. Although the draft would come to Pennsylvania in September, the members of the 125th enlisted earlier and primarily for "patriotic motives".

Campaigns 

Battle of Antietam (1st Div, 1st Brigade)
Mud March (1st Div, 2nd Brigade)
Battle of Chancellorsville (2nd Div, 2nd Brigade)

Battle of Antietam 

After mustering at Harrisburg, the regiment was assigned to the 1st Brigade, 1st Division, XII Corps in the Army of the Potomac while they trained at Washington, D.C. They marched from Washington to Frederick to Sharpsburg in response to the Confederate Army's crossing of the Potomac River into Maryland. Less than six weeks after mustering, with a minimum of training, and without combat experience they entered the battle on the morning of September 17, 1862.

As the fighting effectiveness of General Hooker's First Corps waned, the Twelfth Corps marched into battle under the command of General Joseph K. F. Mansfield. Certain that the five new regiments of Williams' First Division would run away if deployed in line of battle, Mansfield ordered the First Brigade to lead in a tight formation known as close column of companies. This deterrent to flight transformed the massed troops into an ideal artillery target. As shot and shell began to fly over and drop nearby, a single strike could have killed dozens of men.

While forming line of battle east of Smoketown road and 250 yards north of the East Woods, they observed a mortally wounded General Mansfield as he returned on his horse from a forward reconnaissance position. Three members of the 125th Pennsylvania (Coho, Edmundson, & Rudy, along with two others) helped him from his horse, carried him to the rear on a chair formed from muskets, and turned him over to a surgeon.

After a delay for re-organization, the 125th Pennsylvania moved forward to support Monroe's First Rhode Island Battery (I Corps, 1 Div) diagonally across the intersection of Smoketown Road and Hagerstown Pike at about 8:45. They were then detached from the XII Corps, 1st Division, and making a stand with Tyndale's and Stainbrook's Brigades of Greene's 2nd Division (XII), and Confederates were forced to temporarily withdraw from the West Woods.

By 9:00 they moved 100 yards farther ahead but remained the lone Union element in the West Woods. By about 9:15 as the Confederates counter-attacked, the 34th NY (II,2) arrived to the 125th Pennsylvania's rear, while the 7th MI (II,2) arrived remotely to the 125th Pennsylvania's right, and Sumner's (II Corps) "Disaster in the West Woods" began.

Receiving heavy fire from Kershaw's Brigade of McLaw's Division under Longstreet and Early's brigade of Ewell's Division under Stonewall Jackson, the outnumbered 125th Pennsylvania and 34th NY resisted for a few more minutes, during which time they sustained a very high rate of casualties, and were finally forced to retreat. Sensing a rout, the Confederates followed the retreating regiments and continued to administer fire until Union artillery elements stalled their pursuit. The 125th Pennsylvania remained with Monroe's Battery (now re-positioned near the intersection of Smoketown Road and Mumma Farm Lane) until the end of the Battle.

The commander of II Corps, 2nd Division, 1st Brigade, Brigadier General Willis A. Gorman, observed the performance and fate of the 125th Pennsylvania and commented, "On our left, in the woods, there was a force that told me they belonged to General Crawford's brigade, that were posted there when we first entered it. They fought handsomely until the heavy force of the enemy turned their left, when they retired rapidly, and by this movement in five minutes the enemy's fire came pouring hotly on our left flank and rear."

Battle analysis 
In his memoirs General William T. Sherman decried a systematic problem which the 125th Pennsylvania fell prey to at Antietam, along with many other Regiments in their initial battles:
The greatest mistake in our civil war was in the mode of recruitment and promotion. When a regiment became reduced by the necessary wear and tear of service, instead of being filled up at the bottom, and the vacancies among the officers filled from the best non-commissioned officers and men, the habit was to raise new regiments, with new colonels, captains, and men, leaving the old and experienced battalions to dwindle away into mere skeleton organizations.</p>

Significantly, Antietam was the last battle fought in the east without the construction of field fortifications, although naturally occurring features, such as the Sunken Road and the quarry holes above the Burnside Bridge, were exploited as rifle pits. Three months after Antietam at Fredericksburg, several of Longstreet's divisions fought behind breastworks, and eight months after Antietam at Chancellorsville, both armies constructed hasty fortifications at every opportunity.

Battlefield monument 

The 125th Pennsylvania Volunteer Infantry Monument on the Antietam Battlefield was dedicated on September 17, 1904, and is located on Confederate Avenue behind (West) of the Dunker Church. During the 125th Pennsylvania's withdrawal from the indicated position in the West Woods, one of the most dramatic events in the regiment's history began with the regimental color-bearer, Sergeant George Simpson who stands immortalized in granite on top of the monument:
After receiving a bullet to the brain, Simpson fell on the flag and stained it with blood oozing from his right temple. Corporal Eugene Boblitz of Company H grabbed the colors and was soon felled with a leg wound that crippled him for life. Several other soldiers were shot trying to save the colors. Finally, Sergeant W.W. Greenland snatched up the bloodstained banner and passed it on to Captain William Wallace, who used it to rally the regiment. About 200 men formed in line, and about 60 gathered around the much-contested colors in protection. In the twenty-first century, there is often much debate over how we treat the flag. In the Civil War, there was none. Many soldiers were willing to give their lives for that flag.

Mud March 

By October 30, 1862, the 125th Pennsylvania had been reassigned to the 2nd Brigade, 1st Division (XII Corps) under Brigadier General Thomas L. Kane and newly positioned at Loudon Heights, VA, near Harper's Ferry, for extended drilling. Departing on December 10, one leg of the 125th Pennsylvania's march toward Fredericksburg was brilliantly fortunate (avoiding Burnside's signature disaster), but the second leg coincided with Burnside's fatal act of futility, the Mud March.

Escorting the XII Corps' train of ammunition wagons from Dumfries (January 20) to Stafford Courthouse (January 24), the 125th Pennsylvania endured the same days of heavy rain which stalled the movement of the Army's Center Grand Division (III and V Corps) toward Banks' Ford. All participants in the Mud March moved very slowly or became stuck fast, and Burnside's aspirations for success at Fredericksburg expired with his command.

Battle of Chancellorsville

April 27–30 

On April 27–28, the initial three corps of the Army of the Potomac began their march under the leadership of General Henry W. Slocum. They crossed the Rappahannock and Rapidan rivers as planned and began to concentrate on April 30 around the hamlet of Chancellorsville, which was little more than a single large, brick mansion at the junction of the Orange Turnpike and Orange Plank Road.

Upon reaching Chancellorsville on April 30, 1863, General Joseph Hooker deployed the Army of the Potomac in a defensive perimeter around the intersection. Slocum's Twelfth Corps held the center of the Union line, and for three days, his troops entrenched, creating a sturdy earthwork screened by a line of fallen trees known as abatis.

May 1 

While Hooker still maintained the initiative, he commanded a three-pronged eastward thrust. The 1st & 3rd Divisions of the V Corps (Meade) advanced along River Road, the 2nd Division (Sykes) advanced along the Turnpike, and the entirety of the XII Corps (Slocum) advanced along the Plank Road. One mile out, Slocum (XII Corps, including the 125th Pennsylvania) encountered a Confederate picket post and reacted cautiously by deploying his two divisions in line of battle, one Division on each side of Plank Road. Advancing slowly for the next half mile in this formation, the XII Corps had just emerged onto high ground at the Alrich farm, favorable for an offensive, when a Hooker emissary, Colonel Joseph Dicksinson, reported the advance far short of objective and already engaging the enemy at about 1:30 p.m.

Simultaneously, Hooker received unfavorable reports about the progress of Sykes (V-2)(east of Chancellorsville on the Turnpike) and Sedgwick (VI)(east of Fredericksburg). Meade's (V) 1st & 3rd Divisions were advancing unimpeded toward a strategic imperative, occupation of Bank's Ford on the Rappahannock River; nonetheless, Hooker called a halt to all operations and ordered a retreat into defensive positions around Chancellorsville. Thereby, the initiative had been lost for the remainder of the battle.

May 2 
Between noon and 2 p.m., an armed, westward-moving force became visible and audible to the 125th Pennsylvania's 2nd Division. Private Hicks noted, "From this force we could hear an occasional command, 'Close up,' 'Steady, men,' and like words, and now and then we could catch glimpses of the gray-clothed ranks moving with steady steps, with arms at right shoulder and paying no attention either to us or to our skirmish line in front". The degree of subterfuge associated with the movement was noted by Captain Wallace:
During a suspicious lull in operations, a field officer near me, training his glass on a distant woods, drew my attention to a column of the enemy moving eastward in front of that woods. It was apparently a large force, but as we kept watching it, we were surprised by the occasional reappearance of an officer on a white horse. In each instance he would emerge from our right and disappear on our left, and as it was the same officer, we found that we were witnessing a bit of war strategy, and that a small force was circling many times around that woods to convey the impression that it was an army change of base in one direction, while in reality it was moving the other way.

Following the failure of the Union command to recognize and respond to General Thomas J. Jackson's flanking movement and the subsequent attack, the entire XII Corps attempted to rally the panic-stricken fugitives of the XI Corps, but they would not stop until they were either captured or reached the Rappahannock River. Ultimately, intense night-fighting, especially artillery from Hazel Grove, stemmed the attack, but the 125th Pennsylvania, along with the most of their 2nd Division, was not involved.

May 3 

For two days of battle the Confederates did not test Slocum's position, but starting at 5:30 a.m. on May 3, Lee ordered a broad assault. While Virginians led by General William Mahone attacked the 2nd Division of the XII Corps, Confederate artillery on the Orange Plank Road and at Hazel Grove sent shells screeching into Slocum's line from the rear. The XII Corps gamely held its ground, but as the hours passed, its supply of ammunition ran low. At 9 a.m., Slocum ordered a retreat, and by 10a.m., fighting had essentially ceased with the Confederates in possession of Chancellorsville.

Battle analysis 
Constructing effective breastworks near the Chancellor Mansion and Tavern, the 125th Pennsylvania's Regimental losses were limited (5 killed, 12 wounded, and 10 captured). On May 2, Stonewall Jackson's famous 'Flanking Maneuver' avoided the trap of breastworks placed by the III, XI and XII Corps and led to an attack on the XI Corps' rear.

The fiercest fighting of the Chancellorsville Campaign occurred on May 3, including action at Salem Church and Fredericksburg, and produced the second bloodiest day of the Civil War. The smaller Confederate Army (60,892 CS men vs. 133,868 US men) experienced a significantly higher rate of casualties (22% CS vs. 13% US) than the enemy during General Robert E. Lee's 'Perfect Battle'.

Muster out and after 

Shortly after the Regiment mustered out and returned home, the Confederate victory at the Second Battle of Winchester on June 13–15, 1863, opened the doorway for the invasion of Pennsylvania. Many of the Regiment reenlisted immediately at the State level as part of the Emergency and State Militia Troops of 1863. Others reenlisted for national service in units of infantry, cavalry or artillery, and some successively reenlisted at both levels.

Mission statement and legacy 
"To teach the lesson of patriotism to future generations".

Notable members 
 Henry C. Warfel, Medal of Honor recipient
 Honorable Josiah D. Hicks, U.S. Representative, 53rd, 54th & 55th Congresses
 Honorable Thomas McCamant, Pennsylvania Auditor General, 1888–1892
 Walter W. Greenland, Adjutant-General of the Commonwealth of Pennsylvania, 1892–1895
 Thomas Williamson Hurd Sr., Mayor of Altoona, 1878–1880
 John D. Patterson, Mayor of Harrisburg, 1875–1881

Notes

References

Sources 

 

 

Military units and formations established in 1862
Military units and formations disestablished in 1863
Units and formations of the Union Army from Pennsylvania
1862 establishments in Pennsylvania